Mark Lythgoe (born 17 December 1962) is a British neurophysiologist, and the founder and director of the Centre for Advanced Biomedical Imaging (CABI) at University College London (UCL), where he is professor of biomedical imaging.

Early life
He attended St Augustine's Catholic Grammar School in Wythenshawe (became St John Plessington High School in 1977 then St Paul's Catholic High School in 1984).

Lythgoe earned a master's degree in Behavioural Sciences from the University of Surrey in 1993, followed by a PhD in biophysics from University College London.

Career
Lythgoe has authored more than 200 papers, in journals including Nature and The Lancet.

In 2015, Lythgoe was director of the Cheltenham Science Festival, and was awarded the Neuroscience Prize for Public Understanding from the British Neuroscience Association, "as someone epitomising the best of public engagement".

He has an h-index of 52.

References

Living people
1962 births
Alumni of the University of Surrey
Alumni of University College London
Academics of University College London
British neuroscientists
Neurophysiologists
People in health professions from Manchester
People from Wythenshawe